Aamir may refer to:
Emir, Islamic leader
Sewy (film), a 100ad film

See also

Amir (disambiguation)
Almir (given name)